Fliers of the Open Skies (Letači velikog neba) is a Yugoslav film directed by Marijan Arhanić and starring Boris Dvornik, Zvonko Lepetić and Milan Štrljić. It was released in 1977.

Plot

External links
 

1977 films
Yugoslav war drama films
Serbo-Croatian-language films
Jadran Film films